The ŽS series 444 is an electric locomotive built for Serbian Railways formed by the overhaul and modernization of 30 ŽS series 441 locomotives.

History
This series is originally based on the license of the Swedish company ASEA and the SJ Rb locomotive from Sweden.  The 30 electric locomotives originally from series 441 of Serbian Railways have been modified by Končar Group from Zagreb, Croatia and MIN (Mašinska Industrija Niš) from Niš, Serbia.  First modified locomotive, that received new code number - ŽS series 444 (former 441-077), has become operational in summer 2004.  Last modified locomotive was opened to traffic in January 2007.  The modification is based on the restoration of 441 series.

Voltage 
This locomotive utilises 25 kV/50 Hz AC.

Liveries 

All class 444 locomotives of Serbian Railways have red and greyish-blue livery which is the same as for other electric locomotives operated -  441 and 461 series.

Fleet

References

External links 

 Characteristics and some description

Bo′Bo′ locomotives
25 kV AC locomotives
444
Railway locomotives introduced in 2004
Standard gauge locomotives of Serbia
Bo′Bo′ electric locomotives of Europe